Ryszard Sroczyński (8 May 1905 – 3 August 1966) was a Polish painter and sculptor.

He was a student of Academy of Fine Arts in Warsaw where his teacher was Karol Tichy.

In 1946 he settled down in Bielsko-Biała where he created his work and was an active member of Association of Polish Artists and Designers.

Sroczyński lived in Bielsko-Biała until his death on 3 August 1966.

Works

References 

1905 births
1966 deaths
20th-century Polish painters
20th-century Polish male artists
Polish sculptors
Polish male sculptors
Academy of Fine Arts in Warsaw alumni
20th-century sculptors
Polish male painters